Francesco Deli (born 17 July 1994) is an Italian professional football player who plays for  club Pordenone.

Club career
Deli made his Serie C debut for Paganese on 8 September 2013 in a game against Pontedera.

On 17 July 2019, he signed a three-year contract with Cremonese. On 28 January 2022, he joined Pordenone on loan until 30 June 2022.

On 13 July 2022, Deli returned to Pordenone on a permanent basis and signed a two-year contract.

References

External links
 

Living people
1994 births
Association football forwards
Italian footballers
Footballers from Rome
Paganese Calcio 1926 players
Calcio Foggia 1920 players
U.S. Cremonese players
Pordenone Calcio players
Serie B players
Serie C players
Serie D players